This is a list of tennis players who have represented the Poland Davis Cup team in an official Davis Cup match. Poland have taken part in the competition since 1925.

Players

References

Lists of Davis Cup tennis players
Davis Cup